The 2021 Farah Palmer Cup season was the 15th edition of the competition. It began on 17 July with the finals taking place on 9 October.

In September, due to the COVID-19 restrictions, Auckland, Counties Manukau, & North Harbour withdrew from the remainder of the competition leaving the remaining ten teams to complete the season. The respective finals was played on the first two weekends of October.

Waikato and Manawatū were crowned champions in their respective Farah Palmer Cup competitions; Waikato defeated Canterbury to win the Premiership final, and Manawatu beat Hawke's Bay to win the Championship final.

Format 

The competition was divided into two divisions: The Premiership is the top division consisting of seven teams, the winner being crowned the champion while the lowest ranked team will be relegated to the Championship. The Championship is the second division consisting of six teams, the winner of the competition gets promoted to the Premiership for the next year.

Standings 

Key: JST – JJ Stewart Trophy holders

Regular season

Week 1 

Bye: Waikato

Week 2 

Bye: Wellington

Week 3 

Bye: Auckland

Week 4 

Bye: Bay of Plenty

Week 5 

Bye: Otago

Week 6

Week 7

Play-offs 

Championship

Premiership

Semi-finals 
Championship

Premiership

Finals 
Premiership

Championship

JJ Stewart Trophy 

The JJ Stewart Trophy is a trophy based on a challenge system, rather than a league or knockout competition as with most football trophies. The holding union must defend the trophy in challenge matches, and if a challenger defeats them, they become the new holder of the trophy.

References

External links 

 

Farah Palmer Cup
Farah Palmer Cup
Farah Palmer Cup
Women's rugby union competitions in New Zealand